Chad Raney (born 1970) is an American entrepreneur, realtor, author, speaker, consultant.  He was the winner of the 1997 Texas Entrepreneur Award, presented to him by then Governor George W. Bush for his medical supplies company, CareChoice. He founded Lone Star Music in 1999 and sold it in 2009.

Raney currently resides in his hometown of Texarkana, Texas, where he works as a realtor and team leader for Keller Williams Realty. He is active in his community, supporting efforts to revitalize Downtown Texarkana and is an active board member of MainStreet Texarkana. Raney helped form Songwriters On The Edge of Texas, a benefit concert series to raise money for CASA of Northeast Texas.

References 

21st-century American businesspeople
1970 births
Living people
People from Texarkana, Texas